Borja Maestro Martínez (born 4 September 1991) is a Spanish motorcycle racer. His brother, Iván Maestro, is also a motorcycle racer.

Career statistics

Grand Prix motorcycle racer

By season

Races by year

References

External links
 Profile on MotoGP.com

1991 births
Living people
Spanish motorcycle racers
125cc World Championship riders